Heather Margaret Robertson (March 19, 1942 – March 19, 2014) was a Canadian journalist, novelist and non-fiction writer. She published her first book, Reservations are for Indians, in 1970, and her latest book, Walking into Wilderness, in 2010. She was a founding member of the Writers' Union of Canada and the Professional Writers Association of Canada, and launched the Robertson v Thomson Corp class action suit regarding freelancers' retention of electronic rights to their work.

Early life
Heather Robertson was born in Winnipeg in 1942. After graduating from Kelvin High School, she completed an Honours BA in English at the University of Manitoba in 1962. Following this, she completed a master's degree at Columbia University

Career
Robertson began her journalism career at the Winnipeg Free Press then moved to the Winnipeg Tribune. In the late 1960s, she received a grant to study native people; this research provided much of the material for her first book, Reservations are for Indians, published in 1970.

Robertson published four books in the 1970s, including Grass Roots, which profiles four modern prairie towns and the difficulties faced by farmers in Western Canada, Salt of the Earth and A Terrible Beauty: The Art of Canada at War. In 1981 she chronicled the life of the Winnipeg bank robber Ken Leishman in The Flying Bandit.

In the 1980s, Robertson turned to fiction based on real-life characters, and won the Books In Canada Best First Novel Award for Willie, A Romance, based on the life of former Prime Minister William Lyon Mackenzie King. Two more novels followed: Lily: A Rhapsody in Red and Igor: A Novel of Intrigue.

Throughout her writing career, Robertson was a prolific freelancer for the CBC and national magazines such as Maclean's, Chatelaine, Saturday Night, Canadian Forum and Equinox.

Personal life
She lived in King City, Ontario, with her husband Andrew Marshall. She died of cancer on March 19, 2014, her 72nd birthday.

Awards and honours
1983 Canadian Authors' Association Fiction Prize (for Willie: A Romance)
1983 Books in Canada Best First Novel Prize (for Willie: A Romance)
1995 National Business Book Award (for Driving Force)
1998 Honorary Doctor of Laws, University of Manitoba
2003 Lawrence Jackson Award for Achievement, Professional Writers Association of Canada
2003 Ontario Historical Society, Best Regional History (for Magical, Mysterious Lake of the Woods)

Bibliography

Novels
Willie: A Romance (1983) Lorimer
Lily: A Rhapsody in Red (1986) Lorimer
Igor: A Novel of Intrigue (1989) Lorimer

Non-fiction
Reservations are for Indians (1970) Lorimer
Grass Roots (1973) Lorimer
Salt of the Earth (1974) Lorimer
A Terrible Beauty: the Art of Canada at War (1977) Lorimer
The Flying Bandit (1981) Lorimer
A Gentleman Adventurer: The Arctic Diaries of Richard H. G. Bonnycastle (1984) Lester & Orpen Dennys
More than a Rose: Prime Ministers, Wives and other Women (1991) Seal Books
On the Hill: A People's Guide to Canada's Parliament (1992) McClelland & Stewart
Driving Force: The McLaughlin Family and the Age of the Car (1995) McClelland & Stewart
Writing from Life: A Guide for Writing True Stories (1998) McClelland & Stewart
Meeting Death: In Hospital, Hospice and at Home (2000) McClelland & Stewart
Magical, Mysterious Lake of the Woods (with Melinda McCracken) (2003) Heartland Associates
Measuring Mother Earth: How Joe the Kid became Tyrrell of the North (2007) McClelland & Stewart
Walking into Wilderness: The Toronto Carrying Place and Nine Mile Portage (2010) Heartland Associates

References

External links 
 Heather Robertson fonds at the University of Manitoba Archives & Special Collections

Canadian women journalists
Canadian women novelists
Deaths from cancer in Ontario
Journalists from Manitoba
Writers from Winnipeg
20th-century Canadian novelists
2014 deaths
1942 births
20th-century Canadian women writers
Canadian women non-fiction writers
Amazon.ca First Novel Award winners